Charles Coote, 1st Earl of Mountrath (c. 1610 – 17 December 1661) was an Anglo-Irish peer, the son of Sir Charles Coote, 1st Baronet, and Dorothea Cuffe, the former being an English veteran of the Battle of Kinsale (1601) who subsequently settled in Ireland.

Irish Rebellion and Civil War
The younger Coote became an MP for Leitrim in the Irish Parliament between 1634 and 1635 and again in 1640, a year before the outbreak of the Irish rebellion of 1641. The elder Charles Coote was active in the suppression of the Irish insurgents in 1642, launching attacks on Clontarf and County Wicklow in late 1641 in which many civilians died; he was killed in action defending Trim in May 1642.

After the death of his father, Charles Coote also led some of the King's forces under Ormonde against the Confederate army, but was captured defending a stronghold in the Curragh of Kildare by an Irish army led by Castlehaven. He was released during the 1643 cessation of arms.

At this time Coote travelled to England with a number of Protestants to agitate for harsh anti-Catholic measures and an end to the cessation. In Dublin Archbishop Ussher condemned the extremism of Coote and his fellows, but Coote was unbending. The King, however, ignored these demands and so Coote joined the Parliamentarians. Coote was appointed commander of Connacht by the Parliamentarians in 1645. Operating from west Ulster, he temporarily overran the northwest of the province over the next two years.

The Cromwellian Conquest
The execution of Charles I in 1649 led local Protestant and Scottish forces in Ulster to join the Duke of Ormond's royalist coalition, thus isolating Coote. He defended Derry against a protracted siege (March–August 1649), with the unlikely assistance of the Irish Confederate Ulster army under Owen Roe O'Neill.

After the New Model Army under Cromwell captured Drogheda, a force of several thousand Parliamentarians under Robert Venables headed north into Ulster, where Coote joined Venables to destroy the Scottish Ulster Royalists at the Battle of Lisnagarvey. By early 1650, however, the Irish Ulster army (now under Heber MacMahon, as O'Neill had died a few months earlier) became active once more, and Coote was again forced onto the defensive. After being reinforced, he advanced on the Irish army at Scarrifholis and routed them, killing over 2,000 soldiers and taking no prisoners. After this, Coote's army attempted to take the formidable fortress of Charlemont, which was defended by the remnants of the Ulster army, but his soldiers suffered heavy casualties before the stronghold surrendered.

With Ulster largely cleared, in June 1651, Coote advanced on Athlone from the North-West, evading a blocking force. Through this movement the town was gained; the town contained a stone bridge over the Shannon and this action thus opened up Connacht to the Parliamentarian army for the first time.

Having entered Connacht, Coote laid siege to Galey Castle, the seat of the Ó Ceallaigh clan. The Ó Ceallaighs resisted, and for their defiance, they were taken to An Creagán (a local stoney, stepped hill), and were hanged. The hill thereafter came to be known as 'Cnoc an Chrochaire', 'the Hill of the Hanging', and gave its name to the adjacent village, now Anglicised as ‘Knockcroghery’.

Coote continued westward and besieged Galway in the winter of 1651. Galway surrendered in April 1652.

Coote inherited the substantial plantation lands of his father in the midlands of Ireland.

Restoration
After Cromwell's death, Coote took part in December 1659 in a coup d'etat against The Protectorate, seizing Dublin Castle. In February 1660 he sent a representative to King Charles II, inviting him to make an attempt on Ireland. Coote was a central figure in the Convention Parliament. Following the Restoration, Charles II ennobled him Earl of Mountrath in 1660 as a reward for his support.

In the remaining months of his life, he was one of the three most powerful men in Ireland, as the King appointed him Lord Justice of Ireland, together with Roger Boyle, 1st Earl of Orrery  and Sir Maurice Eustace. Pending the appointment of the Duke of Ormond as Lord Lieutenant of Ireland, the Lords Justices acted as the interim government. However, deep divisions among the three men, particularly on the question of whether dispossessed Roman Catholics should be allowed to recover their lands, seriously weakened the effectiveness of the regime.

He built Rush Hall near Mountrath, which was the family's main residence for several generations.

Coote died of smallpox in 1661 and was buried in Christchurch Cathedral, Dublin.

Family
He married firstly Mary Rushe, daughter of Sir Francis Rushe and secondly Jane Hannay, daughter of Sir Robert Hannay and had issue by both wives, including Charles who succeeded as 2nd Earl. His widow, Jane, quickly remarried Sir Robert Reading, 1st Baronet, and had further issue.

Notes

References
  – L to M (for Mountrath)

 
 

Year of birth uncertain
1661 deaths
Peers of Ireland created by Charles II
Irish generals
Members of the Parliament of Ireland (pre-1801) for County Leitrim constituencies
Coote
Roundheads
Mayors of Galway
Politicians from County Galway
Politicians from County Roscommon
Members of the Privy Council of Ireland
Charles
Coote, Charles
Earls of Mountrath